The Fighting Code is a 1933 American Western film written and directed by Lambert Hillyer. The film stars Buck Jones, 
Diane Sinclair, Ward Bond, Richard Alexander, Alfred P. James and Erville Alderson. The film was released on December 30, 1933, by Columbia Pictures.

Cast           
Buck Jones as Ben Halliday (as Charles 'Buck' Jones)
Diane Sinclair as Helen James
Ward Bond as Joe Krull
Richard Alexander as Sheriff Olson (as Dick Alexander)
Alfred P. James as Judge Williams (as Alf James)
Erville Alderson as Joshua La Plante (as Erville Anderson)
Gertrude Howard as Housekeeper Martha
Louis Natheaux as Barry 
Niles Welch as Crosby (uncredited)
Bob Kortman as Carter (uncredited)
Charles Brinley as Betts (uncredited)

References

External links
 

1933 films
American Western (genre) films
1933 Western (genre) films
Columbia Pictures films
Films directed by Lambert Hillyer
American black-and-white films
1930s English-language films
1930s American films